Seth Joyner (born November 18, 1964), is a former American football linebacker in the National Football League (NFL) for the Philadelphia Eagles, Arizona Cardinals, Green Bay Packers and Denver Broncos.  Joyner graduated from Spring Valley High School and played college football at University of Texas at El Paso.

Professional career
Joyner was drafted by the Philadelphia Eagles in the 8th round (208th overall) of the 1986 NFL Draft. He was actually cut in training camp, but the Eagles re-signed him later in the season. Joyner played in the NFL for the Philadelphia Eagles (1986–1993), Arizona Cardinals (1994–1996), Green Bay Packers (1997), and the Denver Broncos (1998). Joyner's unique combination of strength and quickness allowed him to excel in all defensive statistical categories and propelled him to three Pro Bowl accolades; being selected in 1991, 1993, and 1994. In one Monday Night Football game in 1991 against the Houston Oilers, Joyner, playing with a 102-degree fever, recorded 8 solo tackles, 2 forced fumbles, 2 fumble recoveries and 2 sacks. He was named NFL Player of the Year by Paul Zimmerman of Sports Illustrated that year and received runner-up honors for Associated Press NFL Defensive Player of the Year, while a member of the Philadelphia Eagles. As a Green Bay Packer, he appeared in Super Bowl XXXII, and the next year, he won Super Bowl XXXIII as a member of the Broncos in 1998, which turned out to be his last game.

He is one of many members in the 20/20 Club for interceptions and sacks in NFL history. He is second in sacks behind Ted Hendricks (60.5) with 52.

Joyner is currently a football analyst on FS1 and on Eagles Pregame and Postgame Live on NBC Sports Philadelphia.

References

External links
 
 

1964 births
Living people
People from Spring Valley, New York
American football linebackers
American football safeties
UTEP Miners football players
Arizona Cardinals players
Philadelphia Eagles players
Green Bay Packers players
Denver Broncos players
National Conference Pro Bowl players
Philadelphia Eagles announcers
Players of American football from New York (state)